Ramona "Mona" Villagomez Mangloña (née Ramona Emma Pangelinan Villagomez; born February 26, 1967) is the Chief United States district judge of the District Court for the Northern Mariana Islands. Her term ended on July 28, 2021 (unless reappointed), and she may serve thereafter until a successor is chosen and qualified.

Early life and education
Mangloña was born February 26, 1967, on Saipan in the Commonwealth of the Northern Mariana Islands.  She graduated from the University of California at Berkeley in 1990 with a Bachelor of Arts in Economics and Japanese.  She received her Juris Doctor from the University of New Mexico School of Law in 1996.

Career
Prior to attending law school, Mangloña worked in her family's real estate management business.  After graduating from law school, she served as a law clerk for two of the judges of the Superior Court of the Commonwealth of the Northern Mariana Islands.  She then joined the Office of the Attorney General, serving first in the criminal division and later in the civil division.  She became Deputy Attorney General of the Northern Mariana Islands early in 2002 and became the first female Attorney General of the Northern Mariana Islands in November 2002.  She was appointed to the Superior Court in May 2003 and resigned from that post in June 2011 to take up her current post in the District Court.

District court service 

On January 26, 2011, President Barack Obama nominated Judge Mangloña to the District Court for the Northern Mariana Islands.  This is considered an Article I judicial appointment, with a term of ten years, rather than life tenure.  The Senate Judiciary Committee held a hearing on her nomination on March 16, 2011, and reported her nomination favorably on April 7, 2011.  On July 26, 2011, the Senate confirmed her nomination by voice vote.  She received her commission on July 29, 2011, and took her oath of office on July 30, 2011. Unless reappointed, her commission expired on July 28, 2021, at which time her term would have ended, although it will continue thereafter until her successor is chosen and qualified.

Personal
Mangloña is married to John A. Mangloña, an associate justice of the Supreme Court of the Commonwealth of the Northern Mariana Islands.  They have two children, Den and Savana.

See also 
 First women lawyers around the world

References

External links
Link to Judge Manglona's Biography at the official website of Northern Mariana Islands Judiciary

|-

1967 births
21st-century American judges
Attorneys General of the Northern Mariana Islands
Chamorro people
Living people
Northern Mariana Islands judges
United States district court judges appointed by Barack Obama
People from Saipan
University of California, Berkeley alumni
University of New Mexico School of Law alumni